Willis Harold O'Brien (March 2, 1886 – November 8, 1962) was an American motion picture special effects and stop-motion animation pioneer, who according to ASIFA-Hollywood "was responsible for some of the best-known images in cinema history," and is best remembered for his work on The Lost World (1925), King Kong (1933), The Last Days of Pompeii (1935) and Mighty Joe Young (1949), for which he won the 1950 Academy Award for Best Visual Effects.

Biography
 

Willis O'Brien was born in Oakland, California. He first left home at the age of eleven to work on cattle ranches, and again at the age of thirteen when he took on a variety of jobs including farmhand, factory worker, fur trapper, cowboy, and bartender. During this time he also competed in rodeos and developed an interest in dinosaurs while working as a guide to palaeontologists in Crater Lake region.

He spent his spare time sculpting and illustrating and his natural talent led to him being employed first as draftsman in an architect's office and then as a sports cartoonist for the San Francisco Daily News. During this time he also became a professional boxer, winning his first nine bouts but retiring after an unsuccessful tenth. He subsequently worked for the railroad, first as a brakeman and later a surveyor, as a professional marble sculptor, and was assistant to the head architect of the 1915 San Francisco World's Fair, where some of his work was displayed. During this time he made models, including a dinosaur and a caveman, which he animated with the assistance of a local newsreel cameraman. San Francisco exhibitor Herman Wobber saw this 90-second test footage and commissioned O'Brien to make his first film, The Dinosaur and the Missing Link: A Prehistoric Tragedy (1915) for a budget of $5,000.

Thomas Edison was impressed by the film and O'Brien was hired by the Edison Company to animate a series of short films with a prehistoric theme, these included R.F.D. 10,000 B.C. and Prehistoric Poultry (both 1917) released as part of Conquest Pictures film packages for youth audiences. During this time he also worked on other Edison Company productions including Sam Loyd's The Puzzling Billboard and Nippy's Nightmare (both 1917), which were the first stop-motion films to combine live actors with stop motion models.

These films led to a commission from Herbert M. Dawley to write, direct, co-star and produce the effects for another dinosaur film, The Ghost of Slumber Mountain (1918), for a budget of $3,000. The collaboration was not a happy one and Dawley cut the 45-minute film down to 11 minutes and claimed credit for O'Brien's pioneering effects work, which combined realistic stop-motion animated prehistoric models with live action. The film grossed over $100,000 and Dawley used the cut effects footage in a sequel Along the Moonbeam Trail (1920) and the documentary Evolution (1923), but O'Brien received little financial reimbursement from this success.

The film however did help to secure his position on Harry O. Hoyt's The Lost World. For his early, short films O'Brien created his own characters out of clay, although for much of his feature career he would employ Richard and Marcel Delgado to create much more detailed stop-motion models (based on O'Brien's designs) with rubber skin built up over complex, articulated metal armatures. The models contained a bladder inside the skeleton model that could be inflated and deflated to give the illusion of breathing. Sir Arthur Conan Doyle, who appeared in the prologue to the film based on his novel of the same name, reportedly showed a reel of O'Brien's animation from the film to his friends, claiming it was real footage of living dinosaurs, to try to convince them that his story was based on fact.

O'Brien married Hazel Ruth Collette in 1925 and they had two sons together, William and Willis, Jr., but the marriage was an unhappy one. O'Brien was reportedly forced into it, and rebelled with drinking, gambling, and extra-marital affairs. The couple had divorced by 1930 and the two boys remained with their mother, who had begun to show unbalanced behaviour. By 1931, Hazel had been diagnosed with cancer and tuberculosis, while William also contracted tuberculosis resulting in blindness in one eye and then the other.

Throughout this time O'Brien worked with Hoyt on a series of cancelled projects included Atlantis for First National studio, Frankenstein, and Creation for RKO Pictures, which was finally cancelled in 1931 with only 20 minutes of effects footage to show for an estimated $120,000 development cost. The studio's head of production, Merian C. Cooper, had recommended the cancellation of O'Brien's project as he thought the story was boring but he was impressed by the effects work and saw how it could be used to facilitate the development of his own pet project about a giant gorilla battling Komodo dragons. O'Brien and the dinosaur models he had created for the cancelled project were put to work on what was to become his best remembered film, the iconic King Kong (1933).

The Academy of Motion Picture Arts and Sciences (AMPAS) proposed giving O'Brien an Oscar for his technical effects on King Kong but Willis insisted that each of his crew receive an Oscar statue also, which the AMPAS refused to do, so O'Brien refused to accept the Oscar award for himself. This act of refusing his Oscar hurt O'Brien's reputation as a player in the Hollywood establishment, forever making him a semi-outsider in the industry, and thus whose own film proposals were seldom taken seriously. One of O'Brien's crew was Linwood G. Dunn, who did all of the optical composites for King Kong and Son of Kong (also 1933), and who was a future Treasurer and President of the AMPAS and who revealed this story in private conversations with various visual effects associates years later, long after O'Brien's death.

The success of King Kong led to the studio commissioning the hurried sequel, which O'Brien described as cheesy. With a limited budget and a short production schedule, O'Brien chose to leave the animation work to his animation assistant, Buzz Gibson, and asked the studio not to credit him on the project. While making one of his daily visits to the set, O'Brien, who had remained close to his two sons after his separation from his estranged wife, invited Willis Jr. and the now completely blind William with him to handle the Kong and dinosaur models. A few weeks after this visit O'Brien's ex-wife, Hazel Ruth Collette, shot and killed William and Willis Jr. before turning the gun on herself. The suicide attempt failed and by draining her tubercular lung actually extended her life by another year. A publicity photo of O'Brien taken around this time shows the anguish on his face. Hazel Ruth Collette remained in the Los Angeles General Hospital prison ward until her death in 1934. On November 17 that same year O'Brien married his second wife, Darlyne Prenett, with whom he remained until his death.

O'Brien continued to work with Merian C. Cooper at RKO on a number of projects including the epic The Last Days of Pompeii (1935) and Dancing Pirate (1936), which was O'Brien's first Technicolor production. The two also developed War Eagles about a race of Vikings riding on prehistoric eagles fighting with dinosaurs, but the project was cancelled when Cooper re-enlisted as a colonel in the U.S. Army Air Forces at the outset of World War II. O'Brien went on to do some special effects work, re-using one of the mattes from Son of Kong, on Orson Welles' Citizen Kane (1941) and George Pal's Oscar-nominated animated short Tulips Shall Grow (1942), as well as developing his own project, Gwangi, about cowboys who encounter a prehistoric animal in a "lost" valley, which he failed to sell to the studio.

The film Mighty Joe Young (1949), on which O'Brien is credited as Technical Creator, won an Academy Award for Best Visual Effects in 1950. Credit for the award went to the film's producers, RKO Productions, but O'Brien was also awarded a statue, this time proudly accepted by him. O'Brien was assisted by his protege (and successor) Ray Harryhausen and Pete Peterson on this film, and by some accounts left the majority of the animation to them.

O'Brien and his wife developed Emilio and Guloso (aka, Valley of the Mist), about a Mexican boy and his pet bull who save their town from a dinosaur called "Lagarto Grande", which was optioned by producer Jesse L. Lasky Sr., with O'Brien and Harryhausen on board to do special effects, before falling through. O'Brien subsequently worked for Cooper at the new Cinerama corporation with plans to do a remake of King Kong using the new wide-screen techniques but ended up contributing a matte for the travelogue This Is Cinerama (1952) when this project also fell through. O'Brien worked with Harryhausen one last time on the dinosaur sequence for Irwin Allen's nature documentary The Animal World (1956). O'Brien's story ideas for Gwangi and Valley of the Mist were developed into Edward Nassour and Ismael Rodríguez's The Beast of Hollow Mountain (also 1956) but he did not work on the film's effects, which were the first to combine stop-motion and live-action in a color film. O'Brien also worked with Peterson again on The Black Scorpion (1957) and  Behemoth, the Sea Monster (aka "The Giant Behemoth") (1959), but the two animators subsequently struggled to find other work.

Allen hired O'Brien as the effects technician on his remake of The Lost World (1960), but he was given little to do as the producer opted for live lizards instead of stop-motion animation for the dinosaurs. One of his story ideas King Kong vs. Frankenstein was developed into Ishirō Honda's King Kong vs. Godzilla (1962) but O'Brien was once again not involved in the production. Shortly before his death, he animated a brief scene for Linwood G. Dunn's "Film Effects of Hollywood" company in It's a Mad, Mad, Mad, Mad World (1963), featuring some characters dangling from a fire escape and ladder, but he died before the film was released.

O'Brien died in Los Angeles on November 8, 1962. He was survived by his second wife, Darlyne. In 1997, he was posthumously awarded the Winsor McCay Award by ASIFA-Hollywood, the United States chapter of the International Animated Film Society ASIFA (Association internationale du film d'animation). The award is in recognition of lifetime or career contributions to the art of animation. His interment was located at Chapel of the Pines Crematory.

The film The Valley of Gwangi (1969), completed for Warner Brothers by Harryhausen seven years after O'Brien's death, was based on an idea the latter had spent years trying to bring to the screen. O'Brien wrote the script for an earlier version of the story which was released as The Beast of Hollow Mountain (US 1956), but O'Brien did not handle the effects for that movie.

O'Brien's work was celebrated in March 1983 with the appearance of his wife, Darlene, at a 50th anniversary event commemorating the day of the first screening of the film at Graumann's (later Mann's) Chinese Theater on Hollywood Boulevard, complete with a screening of a new print of King Kong and a new recreation of the full-scale bust of Kong that appeared 50 years apart at both events in the outdoor lobby of the theater. Three articles in the August, 1983, issue of American Cinematographer magazine detailed the 1983 anniversary event.

In March 1984, O'Brien's work was the subject of a special exhibit at the Kaiser Center in Oakland, California. This exhibit included many sketches, artifacts, and photographs from O'Brien's personal collection, some of which had never been seen in public.

In 2005, Peter Jackson produced and directed King Kong. It was filmed in New Zealand and featured visual effects by Weta Digital. It was dedicated to O'Brien and the other key contributors to the original film.

Ray Harryhausen continued to keep the memory of O'Brien films and life alive for fantasy-cinema fans around the world until his death in 2013.

Filmography

Silent shorts

Herman Webber production, later sold to Edison:

 The Dinosaur and the Missing Link: A Prehistoric Tragedy (1915) (Reissued in 1917 as The Dinosaur and the Baboon by Edison's Conquest Pictures)

Edison Studio's Conquest Pictures (half-reel shorts):

 Morpheus Mike (1917) (Made in 1915)
 Prehistoric Poultry, The Dinornis or Great Roaring Whiffenpoof (1916)
 The Birth of a Flivver (1917) (made in 1916)
 R.F.D. 10,000 B.C.: A Mannikin Comedy (1917) full-reel short
 Curious Pets of Our Ancestors (1917)

Unknown releases:

 In the Villain's Power (1917) 
 Mickey's Naughty Nightmares (1917)
 The Nippy's Nightmare and Mickey and his Goat segments. (The first film to combine stop motion and live action). 
 Sam Lloyd's Famous Puzzles (1917)
 The Puzzling Billboard segment

Herbert M. Dawley Productions:

 The Ghost of Slumber Mountain (1918) 2 reels
 Along the Moonbeam Trail (1920) 1 reel

Feature films
 The Lost World (1925)
 King Kong (1933)
 Son of Kong (1933)
 She (1934, preproduction) 
 The Last Days of Pompeii (1935)
 Dancing Pirate (1936, matte painting)
 Going My Way (1944, matte paintings)
 The Bells of St. Mary's (1945, matte paintings)
 The Miracle of the Bells (1948, matte paintings)
 Mighty Joe Young (1949, Academy Award winner) 
 This Is Cinerama (1952) 
 The Animal World (1956) 
 The Black Scorpion (1957)
 The Giant Behemoth (1959, a.k.a. Behemoth, the Sea Monster)
 The Lost World (1960) 
 It's a Mad, Mad, Mad, Mad World (1963, posthumous release)

Short films
 Tulips Shall Grow (1942, Academy Award nominated)

Story by
 The Beast of Hollow Mountain (1956) *
 King Kong vs. Godzilla (1962) 
 The Valley of Gwangi (1969) - based on O'Brien's unproduced Gwangi (1941)

Abandoned project 
 Creation (1931) – Abandoned feature by RKO due to expense and pace. 20 minutes of completed sequences didn't show enough action to warrant a feature film. (Completed footage later released as an 11-minute short in 16mm rental)

References

Sources and further reading

 Archer, Steve. Willis O'Brien: Special Effects Genius. McFarland & Co.: Jefferson, 1993.
 Shay, Don. "Willis O'Brien: Creator of the Impossible." Cinefex 7, Jan. 1981, pp. 4–71.

External links

 
 "Willis H. O'Brien: special effects pioneer" (Additional information and photos)
 "Willis H. O'Brien: stop-motion pioneer" (early stop-motion shorts and photos)

1886 births
1962 deaths
Animators from California
Articles containing video clips
Burials at Chapel of the Pines Crematory
Clay animators
Special effects people
Stop motion animators